The 1st Singles Box is a box set compilation of singles recorded by the Who throughout their history. The album was released exclusively in the United Kingdom on 25 May 2004. It was considered the counterpart to the other compilation album by the Who, entitled Then and Now. The album was set with twelve compact discs containing two songs each, a la the A-side and B-side of the original single. Each individual CD was encased by a paper sleeve representing the single's original artwork from a particular country.

Track listing
All songs written by Pete Townshend except where noted.

Disc one
 "I Can't Explain" – 2:06
 "Bald Headed Woman" (Shel Talmy) – 2:11

Disc two
 "My Generation" – 3:20
 "Shout and Shimmy" (James Brown) – 3:17

Disc three
 "Substitute" – 3:51
 "Circles" – 3:13

Disc four
 "I'm a Boy" – 2:38
 "In the City" (John Entwistle, Keith Moon) – 2:24

Disc five
 "Happy Jack" – 2:11
 "I've Been Away" (Entwistle) – 2:08

Disc six
 "Pictures of Lily" – 2:45
 "Doctor, Doctor" (Entwistle) – 3:01

Disc seven
 "I Can See for Miles" – 4:08
 "Someone's Coming" (Entwistle) – 2:31

Disc eight
 "Pinball Wizard" – 3:04
 "Dogs Part II" (Moon, Towser, Jason) – 2:27

Disc nine
 "Won't Get Fooled Again" – 3:41
 "Don't Know Myself" – 4:57

Disc ten
 "5:15" – 4:23
 "Water" – 4:42

Disc eleven
 "Who Are You" – 5:08
 "Had Enough" (Entwistle) – 4:31

Disc twelve
 "Real Good Looking Boy" (Townshend, Luigi Creatore, Hugo Peretti and George David Weiss) – 5:43
 "Old Red Wine" – 3:44

Personnel 

Pete Townshend – Lead Guitar & Vocals
Roger Daltrey – Lead Vocals, Harmonica & Rhythm Guitar
John Entwistle – Bass, Vocals, French Horn, Trumpet, Other Brass, Keyboards & Synthesizer
Keith Moon – Drums & Vocals
Zak Starkey – Drums on Real Good Looking Boy & Old Red Wine
John Bundrick - Piano & Hammond organ on Real Good Looking Boy & Old Red Wine
Simon Townshend - Guitar & Keyboards on Real Good Looking Boy
Pino Palladino - Bass on Old Red Wine
Greg Lake - Bass on Real Good Looking Boy

Design
 Design & Art Direction by Richard Evans

References

The Who compilation albums
2004 compilation albums
Polydor Records compilation albums